Donatus Ó Muireadhaigh, O.S.A. (Anglicised: Donatus O'Murray; died 1485) was a fifteenth-century Archbishop of Tuam.

An Augustinian Canon, he was the Dean of Tuam before appointed Archbishop of Tuam by Pope Nicholas V on 2 December 1450. He granted the status of collegiate church to the St. Nicholas' Collegiate Church in Galway in 1484.

Archbishop Ó Muireadhaigh died in office on 17 January 1485.

Notes

References

  
 
 

Archbishops of Tuam
People from County Galway
15th-century Roman Catholic archbishops in Ireland
1485 deaths
Year of birth unknown